Federica Dieni (born 6 March 1986) is an Italian politician who has been a member of the Chamber of Deputies for the Five Star Movement since 2013. She represents the city of Reggio Calabria.

References 

Living people
1986 births
People from Reggio Calabria
People from Calabria
21st-century Italian politicians
21st-century Italian women politicians
Five Star Movement politicians
Deputies of Legislature XVII of Italy
Deputies of Legislature XVIII of Italy
20th-century Italian women
Women members of the Chamber of Deputies (Italy)